Diau Charn is a 1958 Hong Kong Huangmei opera film directed by Li Han-hsiang. The film is based on the 14th century novel Romance of the Three Kingdoms, and stars Lin Dai as Diaochan (Diau Charn).

Cast
 Lin Dai as Diaochan (Tsin Ting dubbed the songs)
 Chao Lei as Lü Bu
 Lo Wei as Dong Zhuo
 Yang Chih-ching as Wang Yun
 Li Yun-chung as Li Ru
 Lo Hsiung as Zhang Wen

Notes

External links

1958 films
Chinese black-and-white films
1950s Mandarin-language films
Films based on Romance of the Three Kingdoms
Films set in 2nd-century Han dynasty
Huangmei opera films
Films directed by Li Han-hsiang